Linda L. Rice (born March 7, 1964 in Racine, Wisconsin) is an American Thoroughbred horse racing trainer and bloodstock agent. A trainer of graded stakes race winners and licensed since 1987, she has won multiple trainer titles at major race meets in the eastern United States.

Background
The daughter of trainer Clyde Rice who died on January 30, 2017, her brothers Curt, Bryan and Wayne also became involved in Thoroughbred racing.

Since 2002, Rice has been a board member of the New York Thoroughbred Horsemen's Association (NYTHA).

Notable runners
In 2000, Rice trained the colt City Zip, from the Adena Springs breeding farm of Frank Stronach, one of only four horses to win the Hopeful, Saratoga Special, and Sanford Stakes for two-year-olds.

On August 18, 2008 at the Saratoga track, Rice's horses finished 1-2-3-4 in the Mechanicville Stakes.

In 2015,  La Verdad was voted the Eclipse Award for American Champion Female Sprint Horse, the first horse trained by Rice to be honored with a year-end championship.

Career Record
On January 12, 2020, Linda Rice won the 2000th race of her career when Scilly Cay captured the Rego Park Stakes at Aqueduct Racetrack.

Starts: 10,860	1st: 2,018 2nd: 1,635 3rd: 1,510 Purses earned: $81,514,078 (As of 4/3/20)

As reported by equibase

Training titles

In 2009, Rice became the first woman in the modern era to win a trainer's title at a major U.S. racing circuit.  She did so at Saratoga Race Course.  She won the award with 75 starters, to the 135 starters of second-place finisher Todd Pletcher.

In addition to her win at Saratoga Racecourse in 2009, in 2011-2012 Rice won back-to-back training titles at Aqueduct Racetrack. In July 2011 she tied Todd Pletcher for top honors in the Spring/Summer meet at Belmont Park.

In 2017, having taken a stable of runners to the Laurel Park Spring meet in Maryland for the first time, Rice tied for the training title in number of wins, doing so with a 53% winning percentage. She had 51 starters to the 128 of her co-win leader, Keiron Magee.

References

1964 births
Living people
American female horse trainers
Sportspeople from Racine, Wisconsin
American horse trainers
21st-century American women